Liocarcinus is a genus of crabs, which includes the flying crab, the vernal crab and several other swimming crabs.

Species
It includes 12 species :

Fossils
 †Liocarcinus atropatanus (Aslanova & Dschafarova, 1975)
 †Liocarcinus kuehni (Bachmayer, 1953)
 †Liocarcinus lancetidactylus (Smirnov, 1929)
 †Liocarcinus oroszyi (Bachmayer, 1953)
 †Liocarcinus praearcuatus Müller, 1996
 †Liocarcinus rakosensis (Lőrenthey in Lőrenthey & Beurlen, 1929)

References

External links

Portunoidea
Crustaceans of the Atlantic Ocean
Taxa named by William Stimpson